Wilson Alexander Marentes Torres (born August 8, 1985 in Facatativá) is a Colombian cyclist riding for Formesán-Bogotá Humana-ETB. He rode in the 2013 Giro d'Italia, and finished in 162nd place.

Palmares
2006
1st stages 4 and 5 Vuelta a Guatemala
2007
 National U23 Time trial Champion
2008
1st stage 12 Vuelta a Colombia
2011
2nd Colombian National Time Trial Championships
2014
1st stage 6b Vuelta a la Independencia Nacional

References

1985 births
Living people
Colombian male cyclists
People from Facatativá
21st-century Colombian people